Daisy D'Arcy (born 12 December 2002) is an Australian rules footballer playing for Gold Coast in the AFL Women's competition (AFLW).

Early life
D'Arcy grew up in Townsville and attended The Cathedral School throughout her upbringing. Her first sporting interests were split between rugby and soccer but her mother forced her to begin playing Australian rules football for the first time in 2017. A talented junior athlete, she represented Queensland in Australian rules football, cricket, rugby sevens and soccer. In 2020, D'Arcy elected to pursue Australian football "because it is a bit of a mix of those other sports" and moved to the Gold Coast to take part in the Suns' academy program on a full-time basis.

AFLW career
At 17 years of age, D'Arcy was drafted to the Gold Coast Suns with pick 60 in the 2020 AFL Women's draft. She became the youngest AFLW player at 18 years and 49 days when she debuted for the Suns in Round 1 of the 2021 AFLW season.

References

External links

2002 births
Living people
Sportswomen from Queensland
Australian rules footballers from Queensland
Gold Coast Football Club (AFLW) players